Zalia is an unincorporated community in Hancock County, West Virginia, United States. It was also known as Brickyard Bend.

References 

Unincorporated communities in West Virginia
Unincorporated communities in Hancock County, West Virginia